Speech recognition is an interdisciplinary subfield of computer science and computational linguistics that develops methodologies and technologies that enable the recognition and translation of spoken language into text by computers with the main benefit of searchability. It is also known as automatic speech recognition (ASR), computer speech recognition or speech to text (STT). It incorporates knowledge and research in the computer science, linguistics and computer engineering fields. The reverse process is speech synthesis.

Some speech recognition systems require "training" (also called "enrollment") where an individual speaker reads text or isolated vocabulary into the system. The system analyzes the person's specific voice and uses it to fine-tune the recognition of that person's speech, resulting in increased accuracy. Systems that do not use training are called "speaker-independent" systems. Systems that use training are called "speaker dependent".

Speech recognition applications include voice user interfaces such as voice dialing (e.g. "call home"), call routing (e.g. "I would like to make a collect call"), domotic appliance control, search key words (e.g. find a podcast where particular words were spoken), simple data entry (e.g., entering a credit card number), preparation of structured documents (e.g. a radiology report), determining speaker characteristics, speech-to-text processing (e.g., word processors or emails), and aircraft (usually termed direct voice input).

The term voice recognition or speaker identification refers to identifying the speaker, rather than what they are saying. Recognizing the speaker can simplify the task of translating speech in systems that have been trained on a specific person's voice or it can be used to authenticate or verify the identity of a speaker as part of a security process.

From the technology perspective, speech recognition has a long history with several waves of major innovations. Most recently, the field has benefited from advances in deep learning and big data. The advances are evidenced not only by the surge of academic papers published in the field, but more importantly by the worldwide industry adoption of a variety of deep learning methods in designing and deploying speech recognition systems.

History
The key areas of growth were: vocabulary size, speaker independence, and processing speed.

Pre-1970
 1952 – Three Bell Labs researchers, Stephen Balashek, R. Biddulph, and K. H. Davis built a system called "Audrey" for single-speaker digit recognition. Their system located the formants in the power spectrum of each utterance. 
 1960 – Gunnar Fant developed and published the source-filter model of speech production. 
 1962 – IBM demonstrated its 16-word "Shoebox" machine's speech recognition capability at the 1962 World's Fair.
 1966 – Linear predictive coding (LPC), a speech coding method, was first proposed by Fumitada Itakura of Nagoya University and Shuzo Saito of Nippon Telegraph and Telephone (NTT), while working on speech recognition.
 1969 – Funding at Bell Labs dried up for several years when, in 1969, the influential John Pierce wrote an open letter that was critical of and defunded speech recognition research. This defunding lasted until Pierce retired and James L. Flanagan took over.

Raj Reddy was the first person to take on continuous speech recognition as a graduate student at Stanford University in the late 1960s. Previous systems required users to pause after each word. Reddy's system issued spoken commands for playing chess.

Around this time Soviet researchers invented the dynamic time warping (DTW) algorithm and used it to create a recognizer capable of operating on a 200-word vocabulary. DTW processed speech by dividing it into short frames, e.g. 10ms segments, and processing each frame as a single unit. Although DTW would be superseded by later algorithms, the technique carried on. Achieving speaker independence remained unsolved at this time period.

1970–1990
 1971 – DARPA funded five years for Speech Understanding Research, speech recognition research seeking a minimum vocabulary size of 1,000 words. They thought speech understanding would be key to making progress in speech recognition, but this later proved untrue. BBN, IBM, Carnegie Mellon and Stanford Research Institute all participated in the program. This revived speech recognition research post John Pierce's letter.

 1972 – The IEEE Acoustics, Speech, and Signal Processing group held a conference in Newton, Massachusetts. 
 1976 – The first ICASSP was held in Philadelphia, which since then has been a major venue for the publication of research on speech recognition.

During the late 1960s Leonard Baum developed the mathematics of Markov chains at the Institute for Defense Analysis. A decade later, at CMU, Raj Reddy's students James Baker and Janet M. Baker began using the Hidden Markov Model (HMM) for speech recognition. James Baker had learned about HMMs from a summer job at the Institute of Defense Analysis during his undergraduate education. The use of HMMs allowed researchers to combine different sources of knowledge, such as acoustics, language, and syntax, in a unified probabilistic model.

 By the mid-1980s IBM's Fred Jelinek's team created a voice activated typewriter called Tangora, which could handle a 20,000-word vocabulary Jelinek's statistical approach put less emphasis on emulating the way the human brain processes and understands speech in favor of using statistical modeling techniques like HMMs. (Jelinek's group independently discovered the application of HMMs to speech.) This was controversial with linguists since HMMs are too simplistic to account for many common features of human languages. However, the HMM proved to be a highly useful way for modeling speech and replaced dynamic time warping to become the dominant speech recognition algorithm in the 1980s.

 1982 – Dragon Systems, founded by James and Janet M. Baker, was one of IBM's few competitors.

Practical speech recognition
The 1980s also saw the introduction of the n-gram language model.
 1987 – The back-off model allowed language models to use multiple length n-grams, and CSELT used HMM to recognize languages (both in software and in hardware specialized processors, e.g. RIPAC).

Much of the progress in the field is owed to the rapidly increasing capabilities of computers. At the end of the DARPA program in 1976, the best computer available to researchers was the PDP-10 with 4 MB ram. It could take up to 100 minutes to decode just 30 seconds of speech.

Two practical products were:
 1984 – was released the Apricot Portable with up to 4096 words support, of which only 64 could be held in RAM at a time.
1987 – a recognizer from Kurzweil Applied Intelligence
 1990 – Dragon Dictate, a consumer product released in 1990 AT&T deployed the Voice Recognition Call Processing service in 1992 to route telephone calls without the use of a human operator. The technology was developed by Lawrence Rabiner and others at Bell Labs.

By this point, the vocabulary of the typical commercial speech recognition system was larger than the average human vocabulary. Raj Reddy's former student, Xuedong Huang, developed the Sphinx-II system at CMU. The Sphinx-II system was the first to do speaker-independent, large vocabulary, continuous speech recognition and it had the best performance in DARPA's 1992 evaluation. Handling continuous speech with a large vocabulary was a major milestone in the history of speech recognition. Huang went on to found the speech recognition group at Microsoft in 1993. Raj Reddy's student Kai-Fu Lee joined Apple where, in 1992, he helped develop a speech interface prototype for the Apple computer known as Casper.

Lernout & Hauspie, a Belgium-based speech recognition company, acquired several other companies, including Kurzweil Applied Intelligence in 1997 and Dragon Systems in 2000. The L&H speech technology was used in the Windows XP operating system. L&H was an industry leader until an accounting scandal brought an end to the company in 2001. The speech technology from L&H was bought by ScanSoft which became Nuance in 2005. Apple originally licensed software from Nuance to provide speech recognition capability to its digital assistant Siri.

2000s
In the 2000s DARPA sponsored two speech recognition programs: Effective Affordable Reusable Speech-to-Text (EARS) in 2002 and Global Autonomous Language Exploitation (GALE). Four teams participated in the EARS program: IBM, a team led by BBN with LIMSI and Univ. of Pittsburgh, Cambridge University, and a team composed of ICSI, SRI and University of Washington. EARS funded the collection of the Switchboard telephone speech corpus containing 260 hours of recorded conversations from over 500 speakers. The GALE program focused on Arabic and Mandarin broadcast news speech. Google's first effort at speech recognition came in 2007 after hiring some researchers from Nuance. The first product was GOOG-411, a telephone based directory service. The recordings from GOOG-411 produced valuable data that helped Google improve their recognition systems. Google Voice Search is now supported in over 30 languages.

In the United States, the National Security Agency has made use of a type of speech recognition for keyword spotting since at least 2006. This technology allows analysts to search through large volumes of recorded conversations and isolate mentions of keywords. Recordings can be indexed and analysts can run queries over the database to find conversations of interest. Some government research programs focused on intelligence applications of speech recognition, e.g. DARPA's EARS's program and IARPA's Babel program.

In the early 2000s, speech recognition was still dominated by traditional approaches such as Hidden Markov Models combined with feedforward artificial neural networks.
Today, however, many aspects of speech recognition have been taken over by a deep learning method called Long short-term memory (LSTM), a recurrent neural network published by Sepp Hochreiter & Jürgen Schmidhuber in 1997. LSTM RNNs avoid the vanishing gradient problem and can learn "Very Deep Learning" tasks that require memories of events that happened thousands of discrete time steps ago, which is important for speech.
Around 2007, LSTM trained by Connectionist Temporal Classification (CTC) started to outperform traditional speech recognition in certain applications. In 2015, Google's speech recognition reportedly experienced a dramatic performance jump of 49% through CTC-trained LSTM, which is now available through Google Voice to all smartphone users. Transformers, a type of neural network based on solely on attention, have been widely adopted in computer vision and language modeling, sparking the interest of adapting such models to new domains, including speech recognition. Some recent papers reported superior performance levels using transformer models for speech recognition, but these models usually require large scale training datasets to reach high performance levels.

The use of deep feedforward (non-recurrent) networks for acoustic modeling was introduced during the later part of 2009 by Geoffrey Hinton and his students at the University of Toronto and by Li Deng and colleagues at Microsoft Research, initially in the collaborative work between Microsoft and the University of Toronto which was subsequently expanded to include IBM and Google (hence "The shared views of four research groups" subtitle in their 2012 review paper). A Microsoft research executive called this innovation "the most dramatic change in accuracy since 1979". In contrast to the steady incremental improvements of the past few decades, the application of deep learning decreased word error rate by 30%. This innovation was quickly adopted across the field. Researchers have begun to use deep learning techniques for language modeling as well.

In the long history of speech recognition, both shallow form and deep form (e.g. recurrent nets) of artificial neural networks had been explored for many years during 1980s, 1990s and a few years into the 2000s.
But these methods never won over the non-uniform internal-handcrafting Gaussian mixture model/Hidden Markov model (GMM-HMM) technology based on generative models of speech trained discriminatively. A number of key difficulties had been methodologically analyzed in the 1990s, including gradient diminishing and weak temporal correlation structure in the neural predictive models. All these difficulties were in addition to the lack of big training data and big computing power in these early days. Most speech recognition researchers who understood such barriers hence subsequently moved away from neural nets to pursue generative modeling approaches until the recent resurgence of deep learning starting around 2009–2010 that had overcome all these difficulties. Hinton et al. and Deng et al. reviewed part of this recent history about how their collaboration with each other and then with colleagues across four groups (University of Toronto, Microsoft, Google, and IBM) ignited a renaissance of applications of deep feedforward neural networks to speech recognition.

2010s
By early 2010s speech recognition, also called voice recognition was clearly differentiated from speaker recognition, and speaker independence was considered a major breakthrough. Until then, systems required a "training" period.  A 1987 ad for a doll had carried the tagline "Finally, the doll that understands you." – despite the fact that it was described as "which children could train to respond to their voice".

In 2017, Microsoft researchers reached a historical human parity milestone of transcribing conversational telephony speech on the widely benchmarked Switchboard task. Multiple deep learning models were used to optimize speech recognition accuracy. The speech recognition word error rate was reported to be as low as 4 professional human transcribers working together on the same benchmark, which was funded by IBM Watson speech team on the same task.

Models, methods, and algorithms
Both acoustic modeling and language modeling are important parts of modern statistically based speech recognition algorithms. Hidden Markov models (HMMs) are widely used in many systems. Language modeling is also used in many other natural language processing applications such as document classification or statistical machine translation.

Hidden Markov models

Modern general-purpose speech recognition systems are based on hidden Markov models. These are statistical models that output a sequence of symbols or quantities. HMMs are used in speech recognition because a speech signal can be viewed as a piecewise stationary signal or a short-time stationary signal. In a short time scale (e.g., 10 milliseconds), speech can be approximated as a stationary process. Speech can be thought of as a Markov model for many stochastic purposes.

Another reason why HMMs are popular is that they can be trained automatically and are simple and computationally feasible to use. In speech recognition, the hidden Markov model would output a sequence of n-dimensional real-valued vectors (with n being a small integer, such as 10), outputting one of these every 10 milliseconds. The vectors would consist of cepstral coefficients, which are obtained by taking a Fourier transform of a short time window of speech and decorrelating the spectrum using a cosine transform, then taking the first (most significant) coefficients. The hidden Markov model will tend to have in each state a statistical distribution that is a mixture of diagonal covariance Gaussians, which will give a likelihood for each observed vector. Each word, or (for more general speech recognition systems), each phoneme, will have a different output distribution; a hidden Markov model for a sequence of words or phonemes is made by concatenating the individual trained hidden Markov models for the separate words and phonemes.

Described above are the core elements of the most common, HMM-based approach to speech recognition. Modern speech recognition systems use various combinations of a number of standard techniques in order to improve results over the basic approach described above. A typical large-vocabulary system would need context dependency for the phonemes (so phonemes with different left and right context have different realizations as HMM states); it would use cepstral normalization to normalize for a different speaker and recording conditions; for further speaker normalization, it might use vocal tract length normalization (VTLN) for male-female normalization and maximum likelihood linear regression (MLLR) for more general speaker adaptation. The features would have so-called delta and delta-delta coefficients to capture speech dynamics and in addition, might use heteroscedastic linear discriminant analysis (HLDA); or might skip the delta and delta-delta coefficients and use splicing and an LDA-based projection followed perhaps by heteroscedastic linear discriminant analysis or a global semi-tied co variance transform (also known as maximum likelihood linear transform, or MLLT). Many systems use so-called discriminative training techniques that dispense with a purely statistical approach to HMM parameter estimation and instead optimize some classification-related measure of the training data. Examples are maximum mutual information (MMI), minimum classification error (MCE), and minimum phone error (MPE).

Decoding of the speech (the term for what happens when the system is presented with a new utterance and must compute the most likely source sentence) would probably use the Viterbi algorithm to find the best path, and here there is a choice between dynamically creating a combination hidden Markov model, which includes both the acoustic and language model information and combining it statically beforehand (the finite state transducer, or FST, approach).

A possible improvement to decoding is to keep a set of good candidates instead of just keeping the best candidate, and to use a better scoring function (re scoring) to rate these good candidates so that we may pick the best one according to this refined score. The set of candidates can be kept either as a list (the N-best list approach) or as a subset of the models (a lattice). Re scoring is usually done by trying to minimize the Bayes risk (or an approximation thereof): Instead of taking the source sentence with maximal probability, we try to take the sentence that minimizes the expectancy of a given loss function with regards to all possible transcriptions (i.e., we take the sentence that minimizes the average distance to other possible sentences weighted by their estimated probability). The loss function is usually the Levenshtein distance, though it can be different distances for specific tasks; the set of possible transcriptions is, of course, pruned to maintain tractability. Efficient algorithms have been devised to re score lattices represented as weighted finite state transducers with edit distances represented themselves as a finite state transducer verifying certain assumptions.

Dynamic time warping (DTW)-based speech recognition

Dynamic time warping is an approach that was historically used for speech recognition but has now largely been displaced by the more successful HMM-based approach.

Dynamic time warping is an algorithm for measuring similarity between two sequences that may vary in time or speed. For instance, similarities in walking patterns would be detected, even if in one video the person was walking slowly and if in another he or she were walking more quickly, or even if there were accelerations and deceleration during the course of one observation. DTW has been applied to video, audio, and graphics – indeed, any data that can be turned into a linear representation can be analyzed with DTW.

A well-known application has been automatic speech recognition, to cope with different speaking speeds. In general, it is a method that allows a computer to find an optimal match between two given sequences (e.g., time series) with certain restrictions. That is, the sequences are "warped" non-linearly to match each other. This sequence alignment method is often used in the context of hidden Markov models.

Neural networks

Neural networks emerged as an attractive acoustic modeling approach in ASR in the late 1980s. Since then, neural networks have been used in many aspects of speech recognition such as phoneme classification, phoneme classification through multi-objective evolutionary algorithms, isolated word recognition, audiovisual speech recognition, audiovisual speaker recognition and speaker adaptation.

Neural networks make fewer explicit assumptions about feature statistical properties than HMMs and have several qualities making them attractive recognition models for speech recognition. When used to estimate the probabilities of a speech feature segment, neural networks allow discriminative training in a natural and efficient manner. However, in spite of their effectiveness in classifying short-time units such as individual phonemes and isolated words, early neural networks were rarely successful for continuous recognition tasks because of their limited ability to model temporal dependencies.

One approach to this limitation was to use neural networks as a pre-processing, feature transformation or dimensionality reduction, step prior to HMM based recognition. However, more recently, LSTM and related recurrent neural networks (RNNs), Time Delay Neural Networks(TDNN's), and transformers. have demonstrated improved performance in this area.

Deep feedforward and recurrent neural networks

Deep Neural Networks and Denoising Autoencoders are also under investigation. A deep feedforward neural network (DNN) is an artificial neural network with multiple hidden layers of units between the input and output layers. Similar to shallow neural networks, DNNs can model complex non-linear relationships. DNN architectures generate compositional models, where extra layers enable composition of features from lower layers, giving a huge learning capacity and thus the potential of modeling complex patterns of speech data.

A success of DNNs in large vocabulary speech recognition occurred in 2010 by industrial researchers, in collaboration with academic researchers, where large output layers of the DNN based on context dependent HMM states constructed by decision trees were adopted.
 See comprehensive reviews of this development and of the state of the art as of October 2014 in the recent Springer book from Microsoft Research. See also the related background of automatic speech recognition and the impact of various machine learning paradigms, notably including deep learning, in
recent overview articles.

One fundamental principle of deep learning is to do away with hand-crafted feature engineering and to use raw features. This principle was first explored successfully in the architecture of deep autoencoder on the "raw" spectrogram or linear filter-bank features, showing its superiority over the Mel-Cepstral features which contain a few stages of fixed transformation from spectrograms.
The true "raw" features of speech, waveforms, have more recently been shown to produce excellent larger-scale speech recognition results.

End-to-end automatic speech recognition 
Since 2014, there has been much research interest in "end-to-end" ASR. Traditional phonetic-based (i.e., all HMM-based model) approaches required separate components and training for the pronunciation, acoustic, and language model. End-to-end models jointly learn all the components of the speech recognizer. This is valuable since it simplifies the training process and deployment process. For example, a n-gram language model is required for all HMM-based systems, and a typical n-gram language model often takes several gigabytes in memory making them impractical to deploy on mobile devices. Consequently, modern commercial ASR systems from Google and Apple are deployed on the cloud and require a network connection as opposed to the device locally.

The first attempt at end-to-end ASR was with Connectionist Temporal Classification (CTC)-based systems introduced by Alex Graves of Google DeepMind and Navdeep Jaitly of the University of Toronto in 2014. The model consisted of recurrent neural networks and a CTC layer. Jointly, the RNN-CTC model learns the pronunciation and acoustic model together, however it is incapable of learning the language due to conditional independence assumptions similar to a HMM. Consequently, CTC models can directly learn to map speech acoustics to English characters, but the models make many common spelling mistakes and must rely on a separate language model to clean up the transcripts. Later, Baidu expanded on the work with extremely large datasets and demonstrated some commercial success in Chinese Mandarin and English. In 2016, University of Oxford presented LipNet, the first end-to-end sentence-level lipreading model, using spatiotemporal convolutions coupled with an RNN-CTC architecture, surpassing human-level performance in a restricted grammar dataset. A large-scale CNN-RNN-CTC architecture was presented in 2018 by Google DeepMind achieving 6 times better performance than human experts.

An alternative approach to CTC-based models are attention-based models. Attention-based ASR models were introduced simultaneously by Chan et al. of Carnegie Mellon University and Google Brain and Bahdanau et al. of the University of Montreal in 2016. The model named "Listen, Attend and Spell" (LAS), literally "listens" to the acoustic signal, pays "attention" to different parts of the signal and "spells" out the transcript one character at a time. Unlike CTC-based models, attention-based models do not have conditional-independence assumptions and can learn all the components of a speech recognizer including the pronunciation, acoustic and language model directly. This means, during deployment, there is no need to carry around a language model making it very practical for applications with limited memory. By the end of 2016, the attention-based models have seen considerable success including outperforming the CTC models (with or without an external language model). Various extensions have been proposed since the original LAS model. Latent Sequence Decompositions (LSD) was proposed by Carnegie Mellon University, MIT and Google Brain to directly emit sub-word units which are more natural than English characters; University of Oxford and Google DeepMind extended LAS to "Watch, Listen, Attend and Spell" (WLAS) to handle lip reading surpassing human-level performance.

Applications

In-car systems
Typically a manual control input, for example by means of a finger control on the steering-wheel, enables the speech recognition system and this is signaled to the driver by an audio prompt. Following the audio prompt, the system has a "listening window" during which it may accept a speech input for recognition. 
 
Simple voice commands may be used to initiate phone calls, select radio stations or play music from a compatible smartphone, MP3 player or music-loaded flash drive. Voice recognition capabilities vary between car make and model. Some of the most recent car models offer natural-language speech recognition in place of a fixed set of commands, allowing the driver to use full sentences and common phrases. With such systems there is, therefore, no need for the user to memorize a set of fixed command words.

Health care

Medical documentation
In the health care sector, speech recognition can be implemented in front-end or back-end of the medical documentation process. Front-end speech recognition is where the provider dictates into a speech-recognition engine, the recognized words are displayed as they are spoken, and the dictator is responsible for editing and signing off on the document. Back-end or deferred speech recognition is where the provider dictates into a digital dictation system, the voice is routed through a speech-recognition machine and the recognized draft document is routed along with the original voice file to the editor, where the draft is edited and report finalized. Deferred speech recognition is widely used in the industry currently.

One of the major issues relating to the use of speech recognition in healthcare is that the American Recovery and Reinvestment Act of 2009 (ARRA) provides for substantial financial benefits to physicians who utilize an EMR according to "Meaningful Use" standards. These standards require that a substantial amount of data be maintained by the EMR (now more commonly referred to as an Electronic Health Record or EHR). The use of speech recognition is more naturally suited to the generation of narrative text, as part of a radiology/pathology interpretation, progress note or discharge summary: the ergonomic gains of using speech recognition to enter structured discrete data (e.g., numeric values or codes from a list or a controlled vocabulary) are relatively minimal for people who are sighted and who can operate a keyboard and mouse.

A more significant issue is that most EHRs have not been expressly tailored to take advantage of voice-recognition capabilities. A large part of the clinician's interaction with the EHR involves navigation through the user interface using menus, and tab/button clicks, and is heavily dependent on keyboard and mouse: voice-based navigation provides only modest ergonomic benefits. By contrast, many highly customized systems for radiology or pathology dictation implement voice "macros", where the use of certain phrases – e.g., "normal report", will automatically fill in a large number of default values and/or generate boilerplate, which will vary with the type of the exam – e.g., a chest X-ray vs. a gastrointestinal contrast series for a radiology system.

Therapeutic use
Prolonged use of speech recognition software in conjunction with word processors has shown benefits to short-term-memory restrengthening in brain AVM patients who have been treated with resection. Further research needs to be conducted to determine cognitive benefits for individuals whose AVMs have been treated using radiologic techniques.

Military

High-performance fighter aircraft
Substantial efforts have been devoted in the last decade to the test and evaluation of speech recognition in fighter aircraft. Of particular note have been the US program in speech recognition for the Advanced Fighter Technology Integration (AFTI)/F-16 aircraft (F-16 VISTA), the program in France for Mirage aircraft, and other programs in the UK dealing with a variety of aircraft platforms. In these programs, speech recognizers have been operated successfully in fighter aircraft, with applications including setting radio frequencies, commanding an autopilot system, setting steer-point coordinates and weapons release parameters, and controlling flight display.

Working with Swedish pilots flying in the JAS-39 Gripen cockpit, Englund (2004) found recognition deteriorated with increasing g-loads. The report also concluded that adaptation greatly improved the results in all cases and that the introduction of models for breathing was shown to improve recognition scores significantly. Contrary to what might have been expected, no effects of the broken English of the speakers were found. It was evident that spontaneous speech caused problems for the recognizer, as might have been expected. A restricted vocabulary, and above all, a proper syntax, could thus be expected to improve recognition accuracy substantially.

The Eurofighter Typhoon, currently in service with the UK RAF, employs a speaker-dependent system, requiring each pilot to create a template. The system is not used for any safety-critical or weapon-critical tasks, such as weapon release or lowering of the undercarriage, but is used for a wide range of other cockpit functions. Voice commands are confirmed by visual and/or aural feedback. The system is seen as a major design feature in the reduction of pilot workload, and even allows the pilot to assign targets to his aircraft with two simple voice commands or to any of his wingmen with only five commands.

Speaker-independent systems are also being developed and are under test for the F35 Lightning II (JSF) and the Alenia Aermacchi M-346 Master lead-in fighter trainer. These systems have produced word accuracy scores in excess of 98%.

Helicopters
The problems of achieving high recognition accuracy under stress and noise are particularly relevant in the helicopter environment as well as in the jet fighter environment. The acoustic noise problem is actually more severe in the helicopter environment, not only because of the high noise levels but also because the helicopter pilot, in general, does not wear a facemask, which would reduce acoustic noise in the microphone. Substantial test and evaluation programs have been carried out in the past decade in speech recognition systems applications in helicopters, notably by the U.S. Army Avionics Research and Development Activity (AVRADA) and by the Royal Aerospace Establishment (RAE) in the UK. Work in France has included speech recognition in the Puma helicopter. There has also been much useful work in Canada. Results have been encouraging, and voice applications have included: control of communication radios, setting of navigation systems, and control of an automated target handover system.

As in fighter applications, the overriding issue for voice in helicopters is the impact on pilot effectiveness. Encouraging results are reported for the AVRADA tests, although these represent only a feasibility demonstration in a test environment. Much remains to be done both in speech recognition and in overall speech technology in order to consistently achieve performance improvements in operational settings.

Training air traffic controllers
Training for air traffic controllers (ATC) represents an excellent application for speech recognition systems. Many ATC training systems currently require a person to act as a "pseudo-pilot", engaging in a voice dialog with the trainee controller, which simulates the dialog that the controller would have to conduct with pilots in a real ATC situation. Speech recognition and synthesis techniques offer the potential to eliminate the need for a person to act as a pseudo-pilot, thus reducing training and support personnel. In theory, Air controller tasks are also characterized by highly structured speech as the primary output of the controller, hence reducing the difficulty of the speech recognition task should be possible. In practice, this is rarely the case. The FAA document 7110.65 details the phrases that should be used by air traffic controllers. While this document gives less than 150 examples of such phrases, the number of phrases supported by one of the simulation vendors speech recognition systems is in excess of 500,000.

The USAF, USMC, US Army, US Navy, and FAA as well as a number of international ATC training organizations such as the Royal Australian Air Force and Civil Aviation Authorities in Italy, Brazil, and Canada are currently using ATC simulators with speech recognition from a number of different vendors.

Telephony and other domains
ASR is now commonplace in the field of telephony and is becoming more widespread in the field of computer gaming and simulation. In telephony systems, ASR is now being predominantly used in contact centers by integrating it with IVR systems. Despite the high level of integration with word processing in general personal computing, in the field of document production, ASR has not seen the expected increases in use.

The improvement of mobile processor speeds has made speech recognition practical in smartphones. Speech is used mostly as a part of a user interface, for creating predefined or custom speech commands.

Usage in education and daily life 
For language learning, speech recognition can be useful for learning a second language. It can teach proper pronunciation, in addition to helping a person develop fluency with their speaking skills.

Students who are blind (see Blindness and education) or have very low vision can benefit from using the technology to convey words and then hear the computer recite them, as well as use a computer by commanding with their voice, instead of having to look at the screen and keyboard.

Students who are physically disabled , have a Repetitive strain injury/other injuries to the upper extremities can be relieved from having to worry about handwriting, typing, or working with scribe on school assignments by using speech-to-text programs. They can also utilize speech recognition technology to enjoy searching the Internet or using a computer at home without having to physically operate a mouse and keyboard.

Speech recognition can allow students with learning disabilities to become better writers. By saying the words aloud, they can increase the fluidity of their writing, and be alleviated of concerns regarding spelling, punctuation, and other mechanics of writing. Also, see Learning disability.

The use of voice recognition software, in conjunction with a digital audio recorder and a personal computer running word-processing software has proven to be positive for restoring damaged short-term memory capacity, in stroke and craniotomy individuals.

People with disabilities
People with disabilities can benefit from speech recognition programs. For individuals that are Deaf or Hard of Hearing, speech recognition software is used to automatically generate a closed-captioning of conversations such as discussions in conference rooms, classroom lectures, and/or religious services.

Speech recognition is also very useful for people who have difficulty using their hands, ranging from mild repetitive stress injuries to involve disabilities that preclude using conventional computer input devices. In fact, people who used the keyboard a lot and developed RSI became an urgent early market for speech recognition. Speech recognition is used in deaf telephony, such as voicemail to text, relay services, and captioned telephone. Individuals with learning disabilities who have problems with thought-to-paper communication (essentially they think of an idea but it is processed incorrectly causing it to end up differently on paper) can possibly benefit from the software but the technology is not bug proof. Also the whole idea of speak to text can be hard for intellectually disabled person's due to the fact that it is rare that anyone tries to learn the technology to teach the person with the disability.

This type of technology can help those with dyslexia but other disabilities are still in question. The effectiveness of the product is the problem that is hindering it from being effective. Although a kid may be able to say a word depending on how clear they say it the technology may think they are saying another word and input the wrong one. Giving them more work to fix, causing them to have to take more time with fixing the wrong word.

Further applications
Aerospace (e.g. space exploration, spacecraft, etc.) NASA's Mars Polar Lander used speech recognition technology from Sensory, Inc. in the Mars Microphone on the Lander
Automatic subtitling with speech recognition
Automatic emotion recognition
Automatic shot listing in audiovisual production
Automatic translation
eDiscovery (Legal discovery)
Hands-free computing: Speech recognition computer user interface
Home automation
Interactive voice response
Mobile telephony, including mobile email
Multimodal interaction
Pronunciation evaluation in computer-aided language learning applications
Real Time Captioning
Robotics
Security, including usage with other biometric scanners for multi-factor authentication
Speech to text (transcription of speech into text, real time video captioning, Court reporting )
Telematics (e.g. vehicle Navigation Systems)
Transcription (digital speech-to-text)
Video games, with Tom Clancy's EndWar and Lifeline as working examples
Virtual assistant (e.g. Apple's Siri)

Performance
The performance of speech recognition systems is usually evaluated in terms of accuracy and speed. Accuracy is usually rated with word error rate (WER), whereas speed is measured with the real time factor. Other measures of accuracy include Single Word Error Rate (SWER) and Command Success Rate (CSR).

Speech recognition by machine is a very complex problem, however. Vocalizations vary in terms of accent, pronunciation, articulation, roughness, nasality, pitch, volume, and speed. Speech is distorted by a background noise and echoes, electrical characteristics. Accuracy of speech recognition may vary with the following:
 Vocabulary size and confusability
 Speaker dependence versus independence
 Isolated, discontinuous or continuous speech
 Task and language constraints
 Read versus spontaneous speech
 Adverse conditions

Accuracy
As mentioned earlier in this article, the accuracy of speech recognition may vary depending on the following factors:
 Error rates increase as the vocabulary size grows: 
e.g. the 10 digits "zero" to "nine" can be recognized essentially perfectly, but vocabulary sizes of 200, 5000 or 100000 may have error rates of 3%, 7%, or 45% respectively.
 Vocabulary is hard to recognize if it contains confusing words:
e.g. the 26 letters of the English alphabet are difficult to discriminate because they are confusing words (most notoriously, the E-set: "B, C, D, E, G, P, T, V, Z — when "Z" is pronounced "zee" rather than "zed" depending on the English region); an 8% error rate is considered good for this vocabulary. 
 Speaker dependence vs. independence:
 A speaker-dependent system is intended for use by a single speaker.
 A speaker-independent system is intended for use by any speaker (more difficult).
 Isolated, Discontinuous or continuous speech
 With isolated speech, single words are used, therefore it becomes easier to recognize the speech.
With discontinuous speech full sentences separated by silence are used, therefore it becomes easier to recognize the speech as well as with isolated speech. 
With continuous speech naturally spoken sentences are used, therefore it becomes harder to recognize the speech, different from both isolated and discontinuous speech.

 Task and language constraints
e.g. Querying application may dismiss the hypothesis "The apple is red."
e.g. Constraints may be semantic; rejecting "The apple is angry."
e.g. Syntactic; rejecting "Red is apple the."

Constraints are often represented by grammar. 
 Read vs. Spontaneous Speech – When a person reads it's usually in a context that has been previously prepared, but when a person uses spontaneous speech, it is difficult to recognize the speech because of the disfluencies (like "uh" and "um", false starts, incomplete sentences, stuttering, coughing, and laughter) and limited vocabulary. 
 Adverse conditions – Environmental noise (e.g. Noise in a car or a factory). Acoustical distortions (e.g. echoes, room acoustics)
Speech recognition is a multi-leveled pattern recognition task.
 Acoustical signals are structured into a hierarchy of units, e.g. Phonemes, Words, Phrases, and Sentences;
 Each level provides additional constraints;
e.g. Known word pronunciations or legal word sequences, which can compensate for errors or uncertainties at a lower level;
 This hierarchy of constraints is exploited. By combining decisions probabilistically at all lower levels, and making more deterministic decisions only at the highest level, speech recognition by a machine is a process broken into several phases. Computationally, it is a problem in which a sound pattern has to be recognized or classified into a category that represents a meaning to a human. Every acoustic signal can be broken into smaller more basic sub-signals. As the more complex sound signal is broken into the smaller sub-sounds, different levels are created, where at the top level we have complex sounds, which are made of simpler sounds on the lower level, and going to lower levels, even more, we create more basic and shorter and simpler sounds. At the lowest level, where the sounds are the most fundamental, a machine would check for simple and more probabilistic rules of what sound should represent. Once these sounds are put together into more complex sounds on upper level, a new set of more deterministic rules should predict what the new complex sound should represent. The most upper level of a deterministic rule should figure out the meaning of complex expressions. In order to expand our knowledge about speech recognition, we need to take into consideration neural networks. There are four steps of neural network approaches: 
 Digitize the speech that we want to recognize
For telephone speech the sampling rate is 8000 samples per second; 
 Compute features of spectral-domain of the speech (with Fourier transform);
computed every 10 ms, with one 10 ms section called a frame;

Analysis of four-step neural network approaches can be explained by further information. Sound is produced by air (or some other medium) vibration, which we register by ears, but machines by receivers. Basic sound creates a wave which has two descriptions: amplitude (how strong is it), and frequency (how often it vibrates per second).
Accuracy can be computed with the help of word error rate (WER). Word error rate can be calculated by aligning the recognized word and referenced word using dynamic string alignment. The problem may occur while computing the word error rate due to the difference between the sequence lengths of the recognized word and referenced word. 

The formula to compute the word error rate (WER) is:

where s is the number of substitutions, d is the number of deletions, i is the number of insertions, and n is the number of word references.

While computing, the word recognition rate (WRR) is used. The formula is: 

where h is the number of correctly recognized words:

.

Security concerns
Speech recognition can become a means of attack, theft, or accidental operation. For example, activation words like "Alexa" spoken in an audio or video broadcast can cause devices in homes and offices to start listening for input inappropriately, or possibly take an unwanted action. Voice-controlled devices are also accessible to visitors to the building, or even those outside the building if they can be heard inside. Attackers may be able to gain access to personal information, like calendar, address book contents, private messages, and documents. They may also be able to impersonate the user to send messages or make online purchases.

Two attacks have been demonstrated that use artificial sounds. One transmits ultrasound and attempt to send commands without nearby people noticing. The other adds small, inaudible distortions to other speech or music that are specially crafted to confuse the specific speech recognition system into recognizing music as speech, or to make what sounds like one command to a human sound like a different command to the system.

Further information

Conferences and journals 
Popular speech recognition conferences held each year or two include SpeechTEK and SpeechTEK Europe, ICASSP, Interspeech/Eurospeech, and the IEEE ASRU. Conferences in the field of natural language processing, such as ACL, NAACL, EMNLP, and HLT, are beginning to include papers on speech processing. Important journals include the IEEE Transactions on Speech and Audio Processing (later renamed IEEE Transactions on Audio, Speech and Language Processing and since Sept 2014 renamed IEEE/ACM Transactions on Audio, Speech and Language Processing—after merging with an ACM publication), Computer Speech and Language, and Speech Communication.

Books 
Books like "Fundamentals of Speech Recognition" by Lawrence Rabiner can be useful to acquire basic knowledge but may not be fully up to date (1993). Another good source can be "Statistical Methods for Speech Recognition" by Frederick Jelinek and "Spoken Language Processing (2001)" by Xuedong Huang etc., "Computer Speech", by Manfred R. Schroeder, second edition published in 2004, and "Speech Processing: A Dynamic and Optimization-Oriented Approach" published in 2003 by Li Deng and Doug O'Shaughnessey. The updated textbook Speech and Language Processing (2008) by Jurafsky and Martin presents the basics and the state of the art for ASR. Speaker recognition also uses the same features, most of the same front-end processing, and classification techniques as is done in speech recognition. A comprehensive textbook, "Fundamentals of Speaker Recognition" is an in depth source for up to date details on the theory and practice. A good insight into the techniques used in the best modern systems can be gained by paying attention to government sponsored evaluations such as those organised by DARPA (the largest speech recognition-related project ongoing as of 2007 is the GALE project, which involves both speech recognition and translation components).

A good and accessible introduction to speech recognition technology and its history is provided by the general audience book "The Voice in the Machine. Building Computers That Understand Speech" by Roberto Pieraccini (2012).

The most recent book on speech recognition is Automatic Speech Recognition: A Deep Learning Approach (Publisher: Springer) written by Microsoft researchers D. Yu and L. Deng and published near the end of 2014, with highly mathematically oriented technical detail on how deep learning methods are derived and implemented in modern speech recognition systems based on DNNs and related deep learning methods. A related book, published earlier in 2014, "Deep Learning: Methods and Applications" by L. Deng and D. Yu provides a less technical but more methodology-focused overview of DNN-based speech recognition during 2009–2014, placed within the more general context of deep learning applications including not only speech recognition but also image recognition, natural language processing, information retrieval, multimodal processing, and multitask learning.

Software 
In terms of freely available resources, Carnegie Mellon University's Sphinx toolkit is one place to start to both learn about speech recognition and to start experimenting. Another resource (free but copyrighted) is the HTK book (and the accompanying HTK toolkit). For more recent and state-of-the-art techniques, Kaldi toolkit can be used. In 2017 Mozilla launched the open source project called Common Voice to gather big database of voices that would help build free speech recognition project DeepSpeech (available free at GitHub), using Google's open source platform TensorFlow. When Mozilla redirected funding away from the project in 2020, it was forked by its original developers as Coqui STT using the same open-source license.

Google Gboard supporto speech recognition on all Android applications. It can be activated through the microphone icone.

The commercial cloud based speech recognition APIs are broadly available.

For more software resources, see List of speech recognition software.

See also

AI effect
ALPAC
Applications of artificial intelligence
Articulatory speech recognition
Audio mining
Audio-visual speech recognition
Automatic Language Translator
 Automotive head unit
Cache language model
Dragon NaturallySpeaking
Fluency Voice Technology
Google Voice Search
IBM ViaVoice
Keyword spotting
Kinect
Mondegreen
Multimedia information retrieval
Origin of speech
Phonetic search technology
Speaker diarisation
Speaker recognition
Speech analytics
Speech interface guideline
Speech recognition software for Linux
Speech synthesis
Speech verification
Subtitle (captioning)
VoiceXML
VoxForge
Windows Speech Recognition
 Lists
 List of emerging technologies
 Outline of artificial intelligence
 Timeline of speech and voice recognition

References

Further reading

External links
 Signer, Beat and Hoste, Lode: SpeeG2: A Speech- and Gesture-based Interface for Efficient Controller-free Text Entry, In Proceedings of ICMI 2013, 15th International Conference on Multimodal Interaction, Sydney, Australia, December 2013

 
Automatic identification and data capture
Computational linguistics
User interface techniques
History of human–computer interaction
Computer accessibility
Machine learning task